
Gmina Głuchów is a rural gmina (administrative district) in Skierniewice County, Łódź Voivodeship, in central Poland.

Villages
Gmina Głuchów contains the villages and settlements of Białynin, Białynin-Południe, Borysław, Celigów, Głuchów, Janisławice, Jasień, Kochanów, Michowice, Miłochniewice, Prusy, Reczul, Skoczykłody, Wysokienice and Złota.

Neighbouring gminas
Gmina Głuchów is bordered by the gminas of Biała Rawska, Godzianów, Jeżów, Rawa Mazowiecka, Skierniewice, Słupia and Żelechlinek.

References
Polish official population figures 2006

Gluchow
Skierniewice County